Eric Cabral (born October 5, 1992) is a Canadian former child actor, who acted in television films and series.

Personal life
Eric Cabral was born in London, Ontario. He is the second youngest child, with Adam, who is also an actor and voice actor,  being the youngest. Eric and David both have two older brothers Dave and John respectively.

Filmography

Films
Rated X -  Young Artie Jay Mitchell (2000) (TV film)
Witchblade - Young Nottingham (uncredited) (2000) (TV film)
Wild Iris - Lonnie Bravard (age 6) (2001) (TV film)
Detention - Young boy (2003)

Television
More Haunted Houses - Young Child (2000) 
Falcone -  Christopher Napoli (2000)
The Strange Legacy of Cameron Cruz - Kid #1 (2002)
Witchblade - Young Nottingham (uncredited) (2002) (Episode: "Consectatio")
Odyssey 5 -  Isaac Sussman (2002) (Episode: "The Choices We Make")
Train 48 - – Eric (2004) (1 Episode)

References

External links
 

1992 births
Canadian male child actors
Canadian male television actors
Canadian male voice actors
Living people
Male actors from London, Ontario